This overview lists proposed changes in the taxonomy of gastropods at the family level and above since 2005, when the taxonomy of the Gastropoda by Bouchet & Rocroi (2005) was published. In other words, these are recent updates in the way various groups of snails and slugs are classified.

Changes in subfamilies are outlined in the respective articles about each particular family. Unchanged taxa are not listed here.

In one of the largest recent changes (affecting the most species of gastropods), Klussmann-Kolb et al. (2008) showed that the traditional classification of the Euthyneura needed to be reconsidered. The change was subsequently made by Jörger et al. (2010), who redefined the major groups within the Heterobranchia.

A great number of major changes have been made within the classification of the Conoidea since 2011.

In the 2017 issue of "Malacologia" journal (available online from 4 January 2018) new much updated version of 2005 "Bouchet & Rocroi" taxonomy was published: "Revised Classification, Nomenclator and Typification of Gastropod and Monoplacophoran Families".

Helcionelloida (not gastropods)
It has become clear that the fossil taxon Helcionelloida does not belong to the class Gastropoda; it is now a separate class within the Mollusca. P. Yu. Parkhaev (2006, 2007) created the class Helcionelloida, whose members were previously treated as "Paleozoic molluscs of uncertain systematic position" sensu Bouchet & Rocroi.

Subclass Archaeobranchia Parkhaev, 2001
 Order Helcionelliformes Golikov & Starobogatov, 1975
Superfamily Helcionelloidea Wenz, 1938
Family Helcionellidae Wenz, 1938
Family Igarkiellidae Parkhaev, 2001
Family Coreospiridae Knight, 1947

Superfamily Yochelcionelloidea Runnegar & Jell, 1976
Family Trenellidae Parkhaev, 2001
Family Yochelcionellidae Runnegar & Jell, 1976
Family Stenothecidae Runnegar & Jell, 1980
Subfamily Stenothecinae Runnegar & Jell, 1980
Subfamily Watsonellinae Parkhaev, 2001
 Order Pelagiellifomes MacKinnon, 1985
Family Pelagiellidae Knight, 1952
Family Aldanellidae Linsley et Kier, 1984

Subclass Divasibranchia Minichev & Starobogatov, 1975
 Order Khairkhaniiformes Parkhaev, 2001
Family Khairkhaniidae Missarzhevsky, 1989

Subclass Dextrobranchia Minichev & Starobogatov, 1975
 Order Onychochiliformes Minichev & Starobogatov, 1975
Family Onychochilidae Koken, 1925

Patellogastropoda
This revised taxonomy of the Patellogastropoda (the true limpets) is based on research by Nakano & Ozawa (2007). The Acmaeidae is treated as a synonym of Lottiidae; the subfamily Pectinodontinae is elevated to Pectinodontidae; a new family Eoacmaeidae with the new type genus Eoacmaea is established. The remaining three families (Neolepetopsidae, Daminilidae, Lepetopsidae) are moved into the Lottioidea, like this:
 superfamily Eoacmaeoidea
 family Eoacmaeidae
 superfamily Patelloidea
 family Patellidae
 superfamily Lottioidea
 family Nacellidae
 family Lepetidae
 family Pectinodontidae
 family Lottiidae
 family Neolepetopsidae
 † family Daminilidae
 † family Lepetopsidae

Vetigastropoda
Geiger (2009) elevated the subfamily Depressizoninae to family level as Depressizonidae. Also two subfamilies (the Larocheinae from the Scissurellidae, and the Temnocinclinae from the Sutilizonidae) were upgraded to family level as the Larocheidae and the Temnocinclidae.
 Superfamily Lepetodriloidea
 Family Lepetodrilidae
 Family Clypeosectidae
 Family Sutilizonidae
 Family Temnocinclidae
 Superfamily Scissurelloidea
 Family Scissurellidae
 Family Larocheidae
 Family Anatomidae
 Family Depressizonidae

The superfamily Trochoidea was redefined by Williams et al. (2008) and the superfamily Turbinoidea is no longer used. Phasianelloidea and Angarioidea were created as new superfamilies.

Trochoidea
 Trochidae
 Turbinidae
 Solariellidae
 Calliostomatidae
 Liotiidae
 † Family Elasmonematidae
 † Family Eucochlidae
 † Family Microdomatidae
 † Family Proconulidae
 † Family Tychobraheidae
 † Family Velainellidae

Phasianelloidea
 Phasianellidae
 Colloniidae

Angarioidea
 Angariidae - monotypic with Angaria
 Areneidae (probable placement)

Neomphalina
The superfamily Neomphaloidea was previously regarded as belonging within the clade Vetigastropoda. Molecular phylogeny has shown however that it belongs in its own clade, Neomphalina, which is endemic to deep-sea hydrothermal vent habitat. The clade Neomphalina appears to be basal to the Vetigastropoda. Neomphalina is a monophyletic clade, however, its exact relationship among the gastropods is uncertain.

Neritimorpha
Bandel (2007) described four new families within the Neritopsoidea. He classified Neritopsoidea in the order Neritoina within the superorder Cycloneritimorpha and within the subclass Neritimorpha. Bandel (2007) recognizes Natisopsinae (in Neritopsidae by Bouchet & Rocrois 2005) at the family level, as Naticopsidae. Bandel's classification looks like this:

superfamily Neritopsoidea
 family Neritopsidae
 † Fedaiellidae Bandel, 2007
 † family Delphinulopsidae
 † family Cortinellidae
 † Palaeonaricidae Bandel, 2007
 † Naticopsidae - Natisopsinae (in Neritopsidae by Bouchet & Rocroid 2005) is recognized at family level by Bandel (2007).
 † Tricolnaticopsidae Bandel, 2007
 † Scalaneritinidae Bandel, 2007
 † family Plagiothyridae
 † family Pseudorthonychiidae
 family Titiscaniidae

Caenogastropoda
The family Provannidae was moved to the superfamily Abyssochrysoidea Tomlin, 1927. In addition, a new family Hokkaidoconchidae Kaim, Jenkins & Warén, 2008 was named.
 superfamily Abyssochrysoidea
 family Provannidae
 family Hokkaidoconchidae

The subfamily Semisulcospirinae, within the Pleuroceridae, was elevated to the family level Semisulcospiridae by Strong & Köhler (2009).
 superfamily Cerithioidea
 family Pleuroceridae
 family Semisulcospiridae
 and others

Bandel (2006) made numerous changes in the following clades: Cerithimorpha/Cerithioidea, Turritellimorpha/Turritelloidea, Murchisonimorpha/Orthonematoidea, Campanilimorpha/Campaniloidea and Ampullinoidea, Vermetimorpha/Vermetoidea.

Fehse (2007) elevated both the subfamily Pediculariinae and the tribe Eocypraeini (which were previously in the family Ovulidae) to family level, based on both morphological research and molecular phylogeny research. Families within Cypraeoidea are now as follows:
 superfamily Cypraeoidea
 family Cypraeidae
 family Eocypraeidae
 family Ovulidae
 family Pediculariidae

Within the Tonnoidea, Beu (2008) raised the subfamily Cassinae to the rank of family: Cassidae Latreille, 1825.

Bouchet et al. (2011) updated the taxonomy of the superfamily Conoidea:
 New family Horaiclavidae Bouchet, Kantor, Sysoev & Puillandre, 2011
 Some subfamilies were elevated to families
 The polyphyletic family Turridae was split up in 13 monophyletic families by raising a number of subfamilies to the rank of family.

In 2012, within the Conoidea, a new family Bouchetispiridae Kantor, Strong & Puillandre, 2012 that includes one genus Bouchetispira Kantor, Strong & Puillandre, 2012  and one species Bouchetispira vitrea Kantor, Strong & Puillandre, 2012, was discovered.

In 2015, in the Journal of Molluscan Studies, Puillandre, Duda, Meyer, Olivera & Bouchet presented a new classification for the old genus Conus. Using 329 species, the authors carried out molecular phylogenetic analyses. The results suggested that the authors should place all cone snails in a single family, Conidae, containing four genera: Conus, Conasprella, Profundiconus and Californiconus. The authors group 85% of all known cone snail species under Conus, They recognize 57 subgenera within Conus, and 11 subgenera within the genus Conasprella. .

Heterobranchia
Janssen (2005) established a new family, Praecuvierinidae.

Gosliner et al. (2007) elevated the subfamily Babakininae to the family level as Babakinidae.

Golding et al. (2007) established new families within the Amphiboloidea:
 Maningrididae Golding, Ponder & Byrne, 2007
 Phallomedusidae Golding, Ponder & Byrne, 2007

Uit de Weerd (2008) moved two families Urocoptidae and Cerionidae to the newly established superfamily Urocoptoidea, based on molecular phylogeny research as follows:

superfamily Urocoptoidea
 family Urocoptidae
 family Cerionidae

Other authors also made numerous taxonomic changes within Orthalicoidea in 2009-2012.

Schrödl & Neusser (2010) rearranged the taxonomy of the Acochlidiacea.

Swennen & Buatip (2009) described a new family Aitengidae, which was later moved to Acochlidiacea by Jörger et al. (2010).

Malaquias et al. (2009) rearranged the taxonomy of the Cephalaspidea sensu lato: reinstated Architectibranchia, reinstated Runcinacea, reinstated Scaphandridae as a valid family, but they did not use superfamilies.

Subsequently, Malaquias (2010) moved Bullacta exarata (formerly the only member of Bullactidae) into the family Haminoeidae.

Sutcharit et al. (2010) established a new family Diapheridae within the Streptaxoidea in 2010.

Jörger et al. (2010) redefined major groups of Heterobranchia and created the new clades Euopisthobranchia and Panpulmonata.

Maeda et al. (2010) confirmed the placement of Cylindrobulla within the Sacoglossa.

Thompson (2010) redefined subfamilies in Spiraxidae, moving Euglandininae and Streptostylinae (from where they had been in the Oleacinidae per Bouchet & Rocroi (2005)) so that they became subfamilies of Spiraxidae.

Johnson (2011) resurrected the family Cadlinidae.

Thompson (2012) established a new family, Epirobiidae.

Thompson & Naranjo-García (2012) described a new family Echinichidae within Xanthonychoidea.

Prestonellinae was formally described as a new subfamily within Bothriembryontidae in 2016.

Proposals and research
 Based on nucleotide sequences of mitochondrial genomes Grande et al. (2008) proposed these changes:
 Pulmonata is polyphyletic
 Euthyneura is not monophyletic because the Pyramidelloidea should be included within the Euthyneura
 Opisthobranchia is not monophyletic because Siphonaria pectinata should be recognized as a member of the Opisthobranchia
 Peter J. Wagner considers Isospiridae to be a synonym of Cyrtonellidae within the Tergomya, The Paleobiology Database has adapted  this as yet (February 2010) unpublished opinion by Wagner. This alternate taxonomy is as: Tergomya, Cyrtonellida, Cyrtonellidae.

See also
 List of gastropods described in the 2000s
 List of gastropods described in 2010
 List of gastropods described in 2011

References

Further reading
 
 Millard V. (2008). Classification of Mollusca. (in two volumes + CD-ROM), Edition 4, privately printed, South Africa, 1918 pp. .
 

Gastropod taxonomy
Malacological literature